Romualdas Kasuba (March 23, 1931 – October 10, 2019) was a Lithuanian American academician, mechanics engineer.

Biography

Kasuba moved to Germany in 1944, and emigrated to the United States in 1948.

Kasuba graduated from University of Illinois in 1954. He earned a doctoral degree in 1962.
Kasuba taught at Cleveland State University in 1964-1986 where he also chaired the Department of Mechanical Engineering.
In 1986 Kasuba had co-founded the College of Engineering at Northern Illinois University and became its dean.
In 1989-1996 Kasuba was a member of Senate at Vytautas Magnus University in Kaunas, Lithuania.

Awards and recognition
1999 The National Academy of Sciences of Lithuania elected him as an international member to the academy 
1999 The Diamond Award from the UNESCO International Engineering Education Center for the best paper
In February 2011, an auditorium at Northern Illinois University was named in Kasuba's honor.

References

Vytautas Magnus University
Northern Illinois University faculty
Lithuanian emigrants to the United States
1931 births
Engineers from Kaunas
American academicians
Lithuanian academicians